The Havens is the name of a community and an electoral ward in Pembrokeshire, West Wales.

The community includes the villages of Little Haven, Broad Haven, Walton West and Broadway hamlet. The community population taken at the 2011 census was 1,175.

The Havens ward also includes the neighbouring community of Walwyn's Castle. It had a population of 1,536 in 2011.

References

External links
The Havens community

Pembrokeshire electoral wards
Communities in Pembrokeshire